Country Club Hills is a city in Cook County, Illinois, United States. It is a suburb and south of Chicago. The population was 16,775 at the 2020 census.

History
10,000 years ago, during a glacial period, there was a complex of moraines in this area, before modern times.

Country Club Hills was historically known as Copper's Grove, a German Farmer-based place, throughout the 1800s. It was used for growing crops, and a lot more at that time.

In the 1950s, Copper's Grove started to transition into present-day Country Club Hills, where farms started to move away, and started to get more populated. As a result, Country Club Hills became a incorporated city in 1958. The first town hall was located on a farmhouse on the southeastern corner of present day Cicero Ave. and 183rd St. That building relocated to currently the Police Department building on 175th St in 1975.

The city has been developing rapidly since then, especially in 2006, where the city used a $16 million municipal bond to build a $5 million amphitheatre on the City Campus, a $2 million fire station, an upgraded community park, and various infrastructure improvement projects.

Geography

Country Club Hills is neighbored by Hazel Crest to the east, Flossmoor and Matteson to the south, Oak Forest to the northwest, Markham to the north, and the Cook County Forest Preserves and Tinley Park to the west.

Demographics

As of the 2020 census there were 16,775 people, 5,695 households, and 3,802 families residing in the city. The racial makeup of the city was 86.46% African American, 6.30% White, 0.79% Asian, 0.27% Native American, 0.01% Pacific Islander, 2.21% from other races, and 3.95% from two or more races. Hispanic or Latino of any race were 5.04% of the population.

There were 5,695 households, out of which 49.62% had children under the age of 18 living with them, 36.96% were married couples living together, 21.79% had a female householder with no husband present, and 33.24% were non-families. 29.06% of all households were made up of individuals, and 10.31% had someone living alone who was 65 years of age or older. The average household size was 3.59 and the average family size was 2.88.

The city's age distribution consisted of 22.0% under the age of 18, 9.2% from 18 to 24, 23.7% from 25 to 44, 29.8% from 45 to 64, and 15.3% who were 65 years of age or older. The median age was 40.9 years. For every 100 females, there were 82.1 males. For every 100 females age 18 and over, there were 77.3 males.

The median income for a household in the city was $70,306, and the median income for a family was $85,357. Males had a median income of $51,563 versus $42,955 for females. The per capita income for the city was $30,318. About 11.2% of families and 12.3% of the population were below the poverty line, including 12.7% of those under age 18 and 10.8% of those age 65 or over.

Note: the US Census treats Hispanic/Latino as an ethnic category. This table excludes Latinos from the racial categories and assigns them to a separate category. Hispanics/Latinos can be of any race.

Arts and culture

Country Club Hills is part of the Grande Prairie Public Library District. The Grande Prairie Public Library is located in nearby Hazel Crest.

Government
Country Club Hills is divided between two congressional districts. Nearly all of the city is in Illinois's 2nd congressional district, but some small areas along the city's western edge – primarily between 179th and 183rd Streets west of Lavergne Avenue – are in the 1st district.

Education
Since 1967, Country Club Hills has been home to Bremen Community High School District 228's Hillcrest High School, located at 175th and Pulaski (Crawford). The school has been on an academic watch list for 6 years, and is currently in a "restructuring plan" to increase school academics.

Notable people 

 Danny Clark, linebacker for the New York Giants
 Marquice Cole, defensive back for the New York Jets
 Herb Coleman, American player of gridiron football
 Dee Dee Davis, actress, best known in her role as Bryana “Baby Girl” Thomkins on the Bernie Mac Show
 Koko Taylor, blues singer

See also
List of U.S. communities with African-American majority populations in 2000

References

External links

Cities in Illinois
Chicago metropolitan area
Cities in Cook County, Illinois
Populated places established in 1958
1958 establishments in Illinois
Majority-minority cities and towns in Cook County, Illinois